Frederick Herreshoff (March 7, 1888 – March 23, 1920) was an American amateur golfer of the early 20th century. He was a golfing prodigy: at the age of just 16 he reached the final match of the 1904 U.S. Amateur, finishing runner-up to Chandler Egan by the score of 8 and 6.

Early life
Herreshoff was born on March 7, 1888, to John B. F. Herreshoff and Emaline Duval Lee in Brooklyn, New York. In 1904 he played on the high school golf team at The Hill School, Pottstown, Pennsylvania. He attended Yale University, graduating in 1909.

His father was a metallurgical chemist affiliated with Herreshoff Manufacturing Company of Bristol, Rhode Island, which specialized in the construction of high speed torpedo boats and yachts. The elder Herreshoff was also the president of The General Chemical Company.

Marriage and career
He married Mary Faulkner, an actress, in 1909 when she was playing in a musical comedy at the Casino Theatre in New York City. At that time the Edwardian musical Havana was playing. Mary's name does not appear in the official credits so she must have had an uncredited bit part. Soon after his marriage Herreshoff was engaged as a partner in the banking and brokerage firm of Frenaye & Herreshoff with an office in New York City.

Golf career

1904 U.S. Amateur
Herreshoff, who in 1904 was playing out of Ekwanok Country Club in Manchester, Vermont, finished runner-up in the 1904 U.S. Amateur, held at Baltusrol Golf Club, Far Hills, New Jersey, losing to Chandler Egan by the score of 8 and 6. He got himself into trouble by falling nine holes down after the first 18 holes of play. Herreshoff played better in the second round but it wasn't enough to overcome the large deficit.

1905 four-ball tournament at Fox Hills
Herreshoff, who partnered with George Low in a four-ball tournament held on 16 September 1905 at Fox Hills Golf Club on Staten Island, tied for first place with Alex Smith and C. A. Dunning with a score of 71. A playoff wasn't held due to the fact that Smith was also competing in the individual medal competition which he won from Willie Anderson.

1911 U.S. Amateur

In the 1911 U.S. Amateur—contested at the Apawamis Club in Rye, New York—Herreshoff had won several matches, including the semi-final against Chick Evans. In the final match against Harold Hilton he was at one point trailing by six holes but managed to mount a stunning comeback to tie the match and send it to a playoff. On the 37th hole of the match, Hilton sliced his approach shot badly but instead of finding the deep rough right of the green his ball ricocheted off a flat rock and luckily landed on the green.

Herreshoff, meanwhile, mishit his approach shot to a position short of the green.  His pitch shot to the par 4 hole went 20 feet past the pin. Hilton two-putted for par while Herreshoff was unable to make his 20-foot putt to save par. Hilton was declared the winner by the score of 1 up.

Military service
Herreshoff served in the U.S. Army during World War I in France. He received an honorable discharge on June 2, 1919.

Death
Herreshoff died suddenly of pneumonia on March 23, 1920, in Manhattan, New York. Interment was in Laurel Hill Cemetery, Philadelphia, Pennsylvania.

Results in major championships

M = Medalist
LA = Low amateur
NT = No tournament
DNP = Did not play
WD = Withdrew
"T" indicates a tie for a place
DNQ = Did not qualify for match play portion
R256, R128, R64, R32, R16, QF, SF = Round in which player lost in match play
Yellow background for top-10

Sources: U.S. Open and U.S. Amateur, British Amateur (1912 and 1914)

References

American male golfers
Amateur golfers
United States Army personnel of World War I
The Hill School alumni
Herreshoff family
Deaths from pneumonia in New York City
1888 births
1920 deaths